This article includes the discography for the singer Double.

Albums

Studio

Remix

Compilation

Other

Singles

Video albums

References 

Discographies of Japanese artists
Rhythm and blues discographies